Ostrinia is a genus of moths in the family Crambidae described by Jacob Hübner in 1825. Several of them, including the European corn borer, are agricultural pests.

Species
Ostrinia avarialis Amsel, 1970
Ostrinia dorsivittata (Moore, 1888)
Ostrinia erythrialis (Hampson, 1913)
Ostrinia furnacalis (Guenée, 1854) - Asian corn borer, Asian corn worm
Ostrinia kasmirica (Moore, 1888)
Ostrinia kurentzovi Mutuura & Munroe, 1970
Ostrinia latipennis (Warren, 1892)
Ostrinia marginalis (Walker, 1866)
Ostrinia nubilalis (Hübner, 1796) - European corn borer, European corn worm
Ostrinia obumbratalis (Lederer, 1863) - smartweed borer
Ostrinia ovalipennis Ohno, 2003
Ostrinia palustralis (Hübner, 1796)
Ostrinia penitalis (Grote, 1876) - American lotus borer
Ostrinia peregrinalis (Eversmann, 1852)
Ostrinia putzufangensis Mutuura & Munroe, 1970
Ostrinia quadripunctalis (Denis & Schiffermüller, 1775)
Ostrinia sanguinealis (Warren, 1892)
Ostrinia scapulalis (Walker, 1859)
Ostrinia zaguliaevi Mutuura & Munroe, 1970
Ostrinia zealis (Guenée, 1854)

Disputed species
Ostrinia maysalis P. Leraut, 2012, described from France.

Agricultural problems
The Asian corn borer, Ostrinia furnacalis, is one of the biggest pests of maize in Asia, causing 10%-30% of yield losses in the field, and in some cases up to 80% yield loss. These pests carry fungal pathogens (such as Bipolaris maydis and Curvularia lunata) which cause diseases such as maydis leaf blight and curvularia leaf spot in the crop.

References

External links

Pyraustinae
Crambidae genera
Taxa named by Jacob Hübner